1378 Leonce, provisional designation , is a dark Nysian asteroid from the inner regions of the asteroid belt, approximately 19 kilometers in diameter. It was discovered on 21 February 1936, by Belgian astronomer Fernand Rigaux at the Royal Observatory of Belgium in Uccle, who named it after his father, Leonce Rigaux.

Orbit and classification 

Leonce is a member of the Nysa family, also known as the Nysa-Polana complex, the largest grouping of almost 20 thousand known asteroids in the main belt, consisting of several sub-asteroid families.

It orbits the Sun in the inner asteroid belt at a distance of 2.0–2.7 AU once every 3 years and 8 months (1,336 days). Its orbit has an eccentricity of 0.15 and an inclination of 4° with respect to the ecliptic.

One week later, the body's observation arc begins at Bergedorf Observatory, more than 20 years prior to its official discovery observation at Uccle.

Physical characteristics 

Leonce is an assumed carbonaceous C-type asteroid.

Rotation period and poles 

In 2002, 2007 and 2017, three rotational lightcurves of Leonce were obtained from photometric observations by amateur astronomers René Roy, Laurent Bernasconi and Daniel Klinglesmith and colleges at Etscorn Observatory, respectively. Analysis gave a well-defined lightcurve with a consolidated rotation period of 4.3250 hours and a brightness amplitude between 0.49 and 0.63 magnitude.

In addition a modeled lightcurve, using photometric data from various sources, gave a period of 4.32527 hours, as well as two spin axis of (210.0°, −67.0°) and (46.0°, −77.0°) in ecliptic coordinates.

Diameter and albedo 

According to the surveys carried out by the Infrared Astronomical Satellite IRAS, the Japanese Akari satellite and the NEOWISE mission of NASA's Wide-field Infrared Survey Explorer, Leonce measures between 14.94 and 22.456 kilometers in diameter and its surface has an albedo between 0.0348 and 0.10.

The Collaborative Asteroid Lightcurve Link derives an albedo of 0.0706 and a diameter of 18.16 kilometers based on an absolute magnitude of 12.2.

Naming 

This minor planet was named after Leonce Rigaux, father of the discoverer astronomer Fernand Rigaux. The official naming citation was mentioned in The Names of the Minor Planets by Paul Herget in 1955.

References

External links 
 Asteroid Lightcurve Database (LCDB), query form (info )
 Dictionary of Minor Planet Names, Google books
 Asteroids and comets rotation curves, CdR – Observatoire de Genève, Raoul Behrend
 Discovery Circumstances: Numbered Minor Planets (1)-(5000) – Minor Planet Center
 
 

001378
Discoveries by Fernand Rigaux
Named minor planets
19360221